15 Thank You, Too (stylized as ) is the 15th studio album by the Japanese girl group Morning Musume '17. It was released in Japan on December 6, 2017 with two versions: a limited CD+Blu-ray edition and a regular CD-only edition.

Release details 
The album was announced on October 21 in Hokkaido, during their 2017 Autumn Tour: "Morning Musume Tanjō 20 Shuunen Kinen Concert Tour 2017 Aki ~We are MORNING MUSUME~". Making this their first album in over 3 years and created their widest gap between studio albums.

On November 2, the official track list was released and revealed that only their two most recent singles were included. Leaving out five other singles released between 2015 and 2016. Nonetheless, the album includes 10 brand new tracks and 3 of which are: an unreleased song from 2015, a remake of their 23rd single and a self cover of their indies single with new arrangements.

This release also includes a limited edition Blu-ray recording of their 20th Anniversary Event held on September 14, 2017 in Shinkiba Studio Coast: "Morning Musume Kessei 20 Shuunen Kinen Event ~21 Nenme mo Ganbatte Ikimasshoi!~". The event featured surprise guests, Sayumi Michishige and Reina Tanaka (Morning Musume OG).

This is the first album to feature the 12th, 13th and 14th generations, the last album to feature 10th generation members, Haruka Kudo and Haruna Iikubo, and the only album to feature 12th generation member, Haruna Ogata.

Featured lineup

Morning Musume '17 
 9th generation: Mizuki Fukumura, Erina Ikuta
 10th generation: Haruna Iikubo, Ayumi Ishida, Masaki Sato, Haruka Kudo (last album)
 11th generation: Sakura Oda
 12th generation: Haruna Ogata, Miki Nonaka, Maria Makino, Akane Haga
 13th generation: Kaede Kaga, Reina Yokoyama
 14th generation: Chisaki Morito

Morning Musume OG 
 6th generation (Blu-ray only): Sayumi Michishige, Reina Tanaka

Track listing

Rank and Sales

References

External links 
 Album details on the Hello! Project official site
 Album details on the Up-Front Works official site

2017 albums
Morning Musume albums
Zetima albums
Japanese-language albums
Albums produced by Tsunku
Dance-pop albums by Japanese artists
Electropop albums